Landon D. Huffman (born January 30, 1996) is an American stock car racing driver. Huffman has raced in the NASCAR Camping World Truck Series and CARS Tour. He is the son of Robert Huffman.

Racing career

Gander Outdoors Truck Series
Huffman drove in two races in 2017. He made his Truck Series debut in Bristol, driving the No. 63 truck for MB Motorsports. There he finished 20th. Later that season, he returned at Martinsville, driving the No. 83 truck for MB Motorsports. He improved on his last result, finishing 17th on the lead lap.

On January 22, 2018, NextGen Motorsports announced that the team would like to have Huffman drive between ten and fifteen races in the 2018 NASCAR Camping World Truck Series season. However, the deal fell through.

On October 12, 2018, it was announced that Huffman joined Niece Motorsports' No. 38 truck at Martinsville.

In August 2019, Huffman replaced an injured Spencer Boyd in the No. 20 of Young's Motorsports at Eldora.

Xfinity Series
On January 22, 2018, NextGen Motorsports announced that they would like to have Huffman drive for the team in five 2018 NASCAR Xfinity Series events, starting at Bristol in April. However, the deal never came to fruition.

Late models
Huffman won the track championship at Hickory Motor Speedway in 2022.

Spotting
Huffman previously was the spotter for Zane Smith and his MDM Motorsports team in the ARCA Racing Series, and Anthony Alfredo's MDM entry in the NASCAR K&N Pro Series East.

Esports
In 2019, Huffman founded esports team Total Advantage, which competes in Call of Duty games and iRacing Road to Pro.

Motorsports career results

NASCAR
(key) (Bold – Pole position awarded by qualifying time. Italics – Pole position earned by points standings or practice time. * – Most laps led.)

Gander Outdoors Truck Series

 Season still in progress
 Ineligible for series points

ARCA Menards Series
(key) (Bold – Pole position awarded by qualifying time. Italics – Pole position earned by points standings or practice time. * – Most laps led.)

References

External links
 

Living people
NASCAR drivers
People from Catawba County, North Carolina
1996 births
ARCA Menards Series drivers
Racing drivers from North Carolina